James Haley (born 2 July 1985) is a former professional rugby league footballer who played in the 2000s and 2010s.

References

External links
 (archived by web.archive.org) Halifax profile

1985 births
Halifax R.L.F.C. players
Ireland national rugby league team players
Keighley Cougars players
Living people
Rugby league centres
Rugby league wingers